The Episcopal Diocese of Utah is a diocese of the Episcopal Church in the United States, encompassing the state of Utah, less that part of the Four Corners region which is in the Navajoland Area Mission. It includes a small part of northern Arizona. In 1867, the Episcopal Church was the first Protestant church organized in Utah. The diocesan offices and cathedral, St. Mark's Cathedral, are in Salt Lake City. The current bishop is The Rt. Rev. Phyllis A. Spiegel, whose consecration took place on September 17, 2022.

History
Daniel Sylvester Tuttle was chosen as missionary bishop of Montana, Idaho and Utah on October 5, 1866, and was consecrated on May 1, 1867. He served as bishop until 1886. Tuttle arrived in Salt Lake City on July 4, 1867. George Foote and T. W. Haskins, who held the first church service at Independence Hall in May 1867, preceded him. The cornerstone of St. Mark's Cathedral was laid July 30, 1870. The parish was formally organized in November of that year, with Tuttle as rector. The cathedral was occupied in May 1871, and is listed on the National Register of Historic Places. It is the third oldest Episcopal Cathedral in America. The second bishop was Abiel Leonard. Under his leadership, numerous churches were opened in mining and other communities, including missions to the Ute Indians in the Uintah Basin.

Bishops of Utah
The bishops of Utah are as follows:

Congregations
The Episcopal Church in Utah is part of the worldwide Anglican Communion. The diocese consists of 25 congregations and over 6,000 members across Utah (one congregation is in northern Arizona). The congregations in the diocese include:
Cathedral Church of St. Mark, Salt Lake City
St. Mary's Episcopal Church, Provo
St. Michael's Episcopal Church, Brigham City
Church of the Resurrection, Centerville
St. James Episcopal Church, Midvale
Episcopal Church of the Good Shepherd, Ogden
All Saints Episcopal Church, Salt Lake City
St. Paul's Episcopal Church, Salt Lake City
Grace Episcopal Church, St. George
St. Jude's Episcopal Church, Cedar City
St. Peter's Episcopal Church, Clearfield
St. Barnabas' Episcopal Church, Tooele
St. John's Episcopal Church, Logan
St. Luke's Episcopal Church, Park City

Educational and other institutions
St. Mark's school opened on July 1, 1867, the first non-Mormon school in Utah. Rowland Hall boarding and day school for girls opened in 1880. The two schools combined and became Rowland Hall-St. Mark's School in 1964.
St. Mark's Hospital was organized in 1872 with representatives from the Episcopal Church, Camp Douglas and the mining industry. The hospital moved to increasingly larger quarters several times, and is now located at 1200 East and 3900 South. The hospital was sold in 1987. Hildegarde's Pantry offers food and assistance to people in need.

See also

Anglicanism

Notes

External links
 

Utah
Episcopal Church in Utah
Religious organizations established in 1867
Anglican dioceses established in the 19th century
1867 establishments in Utah Territory
Province 8 of the Episcopal Church (United States)